The 2022–23 season is the 75th season in the existence of Alanyaspor and the club's seventh consecutive season in the top flight of Turkish football. In addition to the domestic league, Alanyaspor are participating in this season's edition of the Turkish Cup. The season covers the period from 1 July 2022 to 30 June 2023.

Players

First-team squad

Out on loan

Pre-season and friendlies

Competitions

Overall record

Süper Lig

League table

Results summary

Results by round

Matches 
The league schedule was released on 4 July.

Turkish Cup

References 

Alanyaspor
Alanyaspor